Mount Whitestone is a rural locality in the Lockyer Valley Region, Queensland, Australia.

Geography 
The summit of Mount Whitestone itself is centrally located and reaches . To the north of the peak Paradise Creek joins Ma Ma Creek. Both of these waterways drain valleys extending southwards on either side of Mount Whitestone.

The Gatton–Clifton Road (State Route 80) passes through from north to south-west. The Tenthill Conservation Park is in the east of the locality.

History 
Mount Whitestone Provisional School was established on 22 March 1886. It became Mount Whitestone State School on 1 January 1909.

Mount Whitestone Church of Christ officially opened on Wednesday 16 August 1899.

Spring Park Provisional School opened in 1918. Circa 1927, it became Spring Park State School. It closed in 1928.

Education 
Mount Whitestone State School is a government primary (Prep-6) school for boys and girls at 1313 Gatton-Clifton Road. In 2017, the school had an enrolment of 23 students with 3 teachers (2 full-time equivalent) and 3 non-teaching staff (2 full-time equivalent).

There is no secondary school in Mount Whitestone, the nearest are Lockyer District State High School in Gatton and Centenary Heights State High School in Centenary Heights, Toowoomba.

References

Lockyer Valley Region
Localities in Queensland